Neustadt am Rübenberge is a railway station located in Neustadt am Rübenberge, Germany. The station is located on the Bremen–Hanover railway. The train services are operated by Deutsche Bahn. The station is also served by the Hanover S-Bahn.

Train services
The following services currently call at the station:

Regional services  Norddeich - Emden - Oldenburg - Bremen - Nienburg - Hanover
Regional services  Bremerhaven-Lehe - Bremen - Nienburg - Hanover
Hannover S-Bahn services  Nienburg - Wunstorf - Hanover - Weetzen - Haste

References

External links
 

Railway stations in Lower Saxony
Hannover S-Bahn stations